Krzysztof Majchrzak (born 2 March 1948) is a Polish film actor. His first part in a major production was in Andrzej Wajda's The Promised Land (1975). He has appeared in 30 films since 1975.  He was nominated for an award as Best Actor for his role in Pornografia at the 2004 Polish Film Awards. Most recently, he appeared in David Lynch's Inland Empire (2006).

Selected filmography

References

External links

1948 births
Living people
Polish male film actors
Male actors from Gdańsk